The Ryukyu tube-nosed bat (Murina ryukyuana) is a species of vesper bat found only in Japan.

Distribution and habitat 
The bat is found only on Okinawa-jima Island, Tokunoshima Island, and Amami-Oshima Island.

References

External links
NatureWatch NZ

Murininae
Taxonomy articles created by Polbot
Mammals described in 1998
Bats of Asia